A total lunar eclipse took place on Friday, February 9, 1990, the first of two lunar eclipses in 1990.

Visibility 

It was visible from all of Africa, Europe, Asia and Australia. The eclipse is sighted over the Philippines since the one that happened on February 20, 1989.

Related eclipses

Eclipses of 1990 
 An annular solar eclipse on January 26.
 A total lunar eclipse on February 9.
 A total solar eclipse on July 22.
 A partial lunar eclipse on August 6.

Lunar year series

Lunar Saros 133 
This lunar eclipse is part of series 133 of the Saros cycle, which repeats every 18 years and 11 days. Series 133 runs from the year 1557 until 2819. The previous eclipse of this series occurred on January 30, 1972 and the next will occur on February 21, 2008.

It is the 5th of 21 total lunar eclipses in series 133. The first was on December 28, 1917. The last (21st) will be on August 3, 2278. The longest two occurrences of this series (14th and 15th) will last for a total of 1 hour and 42 minutes on May 18, 2152 and May 30, 2170. Solar saros 140 interleaves with this lunar saros with an event occurring every 9 years 5 days alternating between each saros series.

Tritos series 
 Preceded: Lunar eclipse of March 13, 1979

 Followed: Lunar eclipse of January 9, 2001

Tzolkinex 
 Preceded: Lunar eclipse of December 30, 1982

 Followed: Lunar eclipse of March 24, 1997

Half-Saros cycle
A lunar eclipse will be preceded and followed by solar eclipses by 9 years and 5.5 days (a half saros). This lunar eclipse is related to two annular solar eclipses of Solar Saros 140.

See also 
List of lunar eclipses
List of 20th-century lunar eclipses

Notes

External links 
 

1990-02
1990 in science
February 1990 events